Arthur Herbert may refer to:
Arthur Herbert (musician) (1907–?), American jazz drummer
Arthur Herbert, 1st Earl of Torrington (c.1648–1716), British admiral and politician 
Sir Arthur James Herbert (1820–1897), general in the British Army
Sir Arthur James Herbert (diplomat) (1855–1921), first British envoy to Norway
Arthur Orpen Herbert (1831–1890), public servant in Queensland